Green County is a county located in the U.S. state of Kentucky. Its county seat is Greensburg. Green was a prohibition or dry county until 2015.

History
Green County was formed in 1792 from portions of Lincoln and Nelson Counties. Green was the 16th Kentucky county in order of formation. The county is named for Revolutionary War hero General Nathanael Greene, but the reason why the final E is missing is unknown.

Three courthouses have served Green County. In 1804, a brick building replaced an earlier log structure, and while no longer operational, it stands in the Downtown Greensburg Historic District as the oldest courthouse building in the commonwealth. The present courthouse dates from 1931.

The Cumberland Trace runs through Green County.  This early road started in Lincoln County, Kentucky, and went to Nashville. (1)

Three counties (Cumberland, Adair, Taylor) were formed entirely from Green County, along with a portion of four more (Pulaski, Barren, Hart, and Metcalfe). (1) 

Green River flows east to west through Green County.  The Paddle Trail provides canoe rentals.  In the early history of the county, flatboats would take tobacco from Green County, to New Orleans.  There, farmers would sell their tobacco, sell their boat (for wood), and walk back to Green County. (1)

Green County was without a sheriff from 1879 until 1918, due to a dispute over railroad taxes.  Individuals were elected sheriff, but were unable to post enough bond to cover not collecting railroad property taxes, and the office was declared vacant.  From 1896 until 1915, a total of 34 murders were committed in the county. (1)

An oil boom from 1958 until the early 1960s gave the county an economic lift.  Temporary air strips were built in the communities of Summersville, and Pierce. (1)

An adobe brick house was uncovered in Greensburg during 2007.  The structure is thought to be the only "mud brick house" in Kentucky. (1)

The Goose Creek Footbridge connects the town square to what was once the train depot.  Built in the late 1920s, the structure is 445 feet long, 40 feet high at its highest point, and has a plank walkway which is five feet wide. (1) 

The community of Summersville is home to weekend music at Green River Live, and to the Skyline Drive-In Theater. (1)

A public hanging in Greensburg on September 21, 1841, attracted a crowd recorded at 10,000 people.  Two other men who were convicted of the same crime - robbery and murder - died in their jail cell. (1)

The country's first known serial killers, Big Harpe and Little Harpe, murdered a twelve-year-old Green County boy in 1799. (1)

(1)  "History of Green County, Kentucky," by Lanny Tucker.

The Cow Days Festival is held in Greensburg the 3rd weekend of September.  The event originated during the late 1930s, when Greensburg merchants would give away a cow to entice people to come to town.

Geography

Green County is in the central time zone.

Adjacent counties
 LaRue County  (north/EST Border)
 Taylor County  (northeast/EST Border)
 Adair County  (southeast)
 Metcalfe County  (southwest)
 Hart County  (west)

Demographics

As of the census of 2000, there were 11,518 people, 4,706 households, and 3,378 families residing in the county. The racial makeup of the county was 96.19% White, 2.61% Black or African American, 0.10% Native American, 0.13% Asian, 0.31% from other races, and 0.65% from two or more races.  0.95% of the population were Hispanic or Latino of any race.

There were 4,706 households, out of which 29.90% had children under the age of 18 living with them, 59.70% were married couples living together, 8.50% had a female householder with no husband present, and 28.20% were non-families. 25.40% of all households were made up of individuals, and 13.20% had someone living alone who was 65 years of age or older.  The average household size was 2.41 and the average family size was 2.87.

In the county, the population was spread out, with 22.70% under the age of 18, 8.10% from 18 to 24, 26.80% from 25 to 44, 25.40% from 45 to 64, and 16.90% who were 65 years of age or older.  The median age was 40 years. For every 100 females there were 96.90 males.  For every 100 females age 18 and over, there were 91.90 males.

The median income for a household in the county was $25,463, and the median income for a family was $31,852. Males had a median income of $25,764 versus $17,510 for females. The per capita income for the county was $16,107.  About 15.20% of families and 18.40% of the population were below the poverty line, including 23.10% of those under age 18 and 18.50% of those age 65 or over.

Communities

City
 Greensburg (county seat)

Census-designated place
 Summersville

Other unincorporated places
 Black Gnat
 Bluff Boom
 Eve
 Exie
 Grab
 Hashingsville
 Little Barren
 Lobb
 Mell
 Newt
 Pierce
 Roachville
 Webbs

Notable people
 Junius George Groves, born a slave in Green County, he moved to Kansas in the 1870s and became known as the "Kansas Potato King," one year producing 72,150 bushels of potatoes on 295 acres.  At his death, Groves owned a 22-room brick house.
 Henry Skaggs (January 8, 1724 – December 4, 1810), an American longhunter, explorer and pioneer

Jane Todd Crawford - On Christmas Day, 1809, Dr. Ephraim McDowell of Danville, Ky., performed the world's first successful ovarian surgery.  Mrs. Crawford and husband, Thomas, road horseback from Green County to Danville, where Dr. McDowell removed a 22 1/2 pound tumor from Mrs. Crawford.  She lived until 1842. (1)

Mentor Graham - A teacher, Graham is credited with giving future president Abraham Lincoln his formal education.  Graham taught at the Brush Creek school in Green County and the Greensburg Academy, before moving to New Salem, Illinois. (1)

George Washington Buckner - born a slave in Green County, in 1913 President Woodrow Wilson appointed him  minister and consul general to Liberia.  A doctor, Buckner practiced medicine in Evansville, Indiana, for 53 years. (1)

Reuben Creel - Serving as an interpreter during the Mexican War, Creel remained there after the war and married.  In 1863, President Abraham Lincoln appointed him United States Consul to Chihuahua, Mexico.  From 1907 until 1909, his son Enrique Clay Creel was ambassador from Mexico to the United States. (1)

James Allen - Greensburg's first attorney was a Brigadier General in the War of 1812, was elected to the Kentucky Senate twice, and to the Ky. House of Representatives once. (1)

Edward Hobson - Greensburg merchant was a Second Lieutenant in the Mexican War; rising to the rank of Brigadier General in the Civil War, Hobson and his troops chased Confederate General John Hunt Morgan and his men on horseback 700 miles over 21 days before Morgan surrendered. (1)

Medal of Honor winner Dakota Meyer is a 2006 graduate of Green County High School. 

High school sports:  Larry Gumm was the first high school baseball coach in Kentucky to win 1,000 games; he retired in 2007 with 1,006 wins, two regional championships, and is a member of the National High School Athletic Coaches Hall of Fame. ... Dragon pitcher Mike Blakeman (1965-1968) holds four Kentucky High School Athletic Association records. ... Retired basketball coach Carl Deaton is a member of the Kentucky High School Athletic Association Hall of Fame; in 1976 he coached the Dragons to their only state tournament appearance. ... His son, Mike Deaton, is also a member of the KHSAA Hall of Fame; during the 1975-'76 school year he was voted first-team All State in both football and basketball, played football at the University of Kentucky, and coached Corbin to a pair of regional basketball championships. (2)

(1) "History of Green County, Kentucky," by Lanny Tucker.
(2) "History Among Us," by Lanny Tucker

Politics

See also

 Dry counties
 National Register of Historic Places listings in Green County, Kentucky

References

External links
 City of Greensburg

 
Kentucky counties
1792 establishments in Kentucky
Counties of Appalachia
Populated places established in 1792